Dr. Jacques Fromaigeat (1913 – 29 April 1988) was a French philatelist who signed the Roll of Distinguished Philatelists in 1974.

Works

He contributed to Le Monde des Philatélistes 1969.
Histoire des timbres-poste de l'Empire in four volumes

References

1913 births
1988 deaths
Signatories to the Roll of Distinguished Philatelists
French philatelists